The Legislative Gazette is a weekly newspaper covering New York state government and politics located in Albany, New York. Published on Mondays from September through June, the publication bills itself as "The weekly newspaper of the New York state government".

The Gazette prints original articles as well as wire stories from the Associated Press. The paper also includes a column by Publisher Alan S. Chartock, carries letters to the editor, and reprints editorials from other New York newspapers. Staff writers for the newspaper are college students in an internship program. Headquartered in the Empire State Plaza Concourse, the Gazette is printed by Denton Publications, Inc. of Elizabethtown, New York.

Although the Legislative Gazette can be picked up free of charge at newsstands, yearly mailed subscriptions cost $99.00.
Revenue comes from advertisements and special pullout advertising supplements. The newspaper is a project of the State University of New York's Research Foundation, and it is sponsored by SUNY New Paltz. Founded in 1978, the Gazette is edited by James Gormley, who succeeded John Bechtel. Bechtel succeeded the paper's first editor, Glenn C. Doty.

The Gazettes website has daily news updates, an AP news feed, a downloadable version of the current print edition, and archived versions of previous editions.

The Gazette had a blog called Empire State Update, which gives daily updates of government and political news related to New York State.

The Legislative Gazette is also the name of a weekly radio program covering New York government on WAMC Northeast Public Radio, where Chartock is president and CEO. The program is hosted by David Guistina and includes commentary by Chartock. The original host was David Galletly.

The Gazette has had several distinguished alumni, including Alex Storozynski, a Pulitzer Prize–winning editor.

References

External links
 
 Empire State Update

1978 establishments in New York (state)
Gazettes
Newspapers published in Albany, New York
Publications established in 1978
Weekly newspapers published in the United States